Theodore Tartakover (11 May 1887 – 28 November 1977) was an Australian swimmer. He competed at the 1908 Summer Olympics and the 1912 Summer Olympics.

References

External links
 

1887 births
1977 deaths
Australian male freestyle swimmers
Olympic swimmers of Australasia
Swimmers at the 1908 Summer Olympics
Swimmers at the 1912 Summer Olympics